Histiocytic sarcoma is a tumor derived from histiocytes. The tumor is often positive for CD163 and can appear in the thyroid. However, in some cases it can also appear in the brain.

References

External links 

Sarcoma